Surava is a former municipality in the district of Albula in the canton of Graubünden in Switzerland.  On 1 January 2015 the former municipalities of Alvaschein, Mon, Stierva, Tiefencastel, Alvaneu, Brienz/Brinzauls and Surava merged to form the new municipality of Albula/Alvra.

History
Surava is first mentioned about 1580 as Surraguas.

Geography

 
Of this area, 10.6% is used for agricultural purposes, while 78.3% is forested. Of the rest of the land, 4.3% is settled (buildings or roads) and the remainder (6.8%) is non-productive (rivers, glaciers or mountains).

The former municipality is located in the Belfort sub-district of the Albula District.  It consists of the linear village of Surava on the right bank of the Albula river.  In 1883 the municipality of Brienz-Surava split into Brienz/Brinzauls and Surava.

Demographics
Surava had a population (as of 2013) of 196.  , 7.0% of the population was made up of foreign nationals.  Over the last 10 years the population has decreased at a rate of -22%.

, the gender distribution of the population was 52.8% male and 47.2% female.  The age distribution, in Surava is; 9 people or 12.0% of the population are between 0 and 9 years old.  6 people or 8.0% are 10 to 14, and 7 people or 9.3% are 15 to 19.  Of the adult population, 4 people or 5.3% of the population are between 20 and 29 years old.  10 people or 13.3% are 30 to 39, 14 people or 18.7% are 40 to 49, and 10 people or 13.3% are 50 to 59.  The senior population distribution is 4 people or 5.3% of the population are between 60 and 69 years old, 3 people or 4.0% are 70 to 79, there are 7 people or 9.3% who are 80 to 89, and there are 1 people or 1.3% who are 90 to 99.

In the 2007 federal election the most popular party was the CVP which received 43.7% of the vote.  The next three most popular parties were the SVP (32.6%), the FDP (18.6%) and the SPS (5.1%).

In Surava about 66.2% of the population (between age 25-64) have completed either non-mandatory upper secondary education or additional higher education (either university or a Fachhochschule).

Surava has an unemployment rate of 0.67%.  , there were 8 people employed in the primary economic sector and about 3 businesses involved in this sector.  22 people are employed in the secondary sector and there are 7 businesses in this sector.  35 people are employed in the tertiary sector, with 8 businesses in this sector.

The historical population is given in the following table:

Language
Most of the population speaks German (78.4%), with Romansh being second most common (10.8%) and Albanian being third ( 2.8%).

References

External links
 Official website 
 

Albula/Alvra
Former municipalities of Graubünden